is the seventh single by the Japanese singer Miho Komatsu, and the last single released under the Amemura-O-Town Record label. It's her first maxi-single. Originally it was supposed to be released as 8 cm single, but the plan has changed. The single reached #17 first week and sold 37,980 copies. It charted for four weeks and totally sold 58,540 copies.

Track listing
All songs are written and composed by Miho Komatsu and arranged by Hirohito Furui

the song was used as the ending theme for the TV Asahi show Paku2 Gurumenbo.
"BOY FRIEND"
 (instrumental)
"BOY FRIEND" (instrumental)

Usage in media
Sayonara no Kakera
for TV Asahi show Paku2 Gurumenbo as ending theme

References 

1999 singles
Miho Komatsu songs
Songs written by Miho Komatsu
1999 songs
Being Inc. singles
Amemura-O-Town Record singles
Song recordings produced by Daiko Nagato